Dirty Deeds is a 2002 film shot in Australia. It was directed by noted fringe director David Caesar and stars Bryan Brown, Toni Collette, Sam Neill, Sam Worthington, John Goodman and Andrew Sommerich and produced by Nine Films and Television, the film and television production arm of the Nine Network, owned by PBL Media, now Nine Entertainment Co.

Plot

Barry Ryan is a late 1960s Australian mobster who controls the Sydney gambling scene and is making huge profits from casino slot machines. His profitable venture attracts the unwanted attention of the American Mafia, who attempt to secure a piece of the action by sending in two of their henchmen: the pensive, world-weary veteran Tony and his violent, not-too-bright sidekick Sal. Ryan soon finds himself fending off the trigger-happy "yanks", outback-style, while also contending with his feisty wife, needy mistress, and a crooked cop.

Music and soundtrack
The soundtrack for the film was produced by Tim Rogers who also wrote much of the original music.

At the ARIA Music Awards of 2002 the soundtrack was nominated for Best Original Soundtrack Album.

Track listing
 "Dirty Deeds Done Dirt Cheap" by You Am I with Tex Perkins – 3:55
 "Titles Sequence" by Paul Healy – 0:47
 "And I Heard the Fire Sing" by Grinspoon – 2:59
 "Trouble"	by You Am I with Bernard Fanning – 5:37
 "New Flat" by Paul Healy – 1:28
 "I'll Be Gone" by Palladium -	3:54
 "Sometimes I Just Don't Know" by You Am I with Billy Thorpe – 5:15
 "Wild About You" by Dallas Crane – 2:44
 "No Good Without You" by Bernard Fanning And Bruce Haymes – 4:30
 "Making Pizza" by Paul Kelly – 1:25
 "Draggin' Yer Bones" by You Am I – 3:29
 "Everlovin' Man" by The Loved Ones – 2:08
 "Made My Bed, Gonna Lie in It" by You Am I With Phil Jamieson – 3:00
 "Washboard Rock'n'Roll" by Lisa Miller, Jody Bell And Tim Rogers – 1:47
 "Black and Blue" by Powder Monkeys -4:25
 "Calendar Eyes" by You Am I – 4:01
 "Bom Bom" by Daddy Cool – 2:33
 "Losin' My Blues Tonight" by Tim Rogers and Lisa Miller – 2:43
 "Plane Leaves" by Paul Healy – 1:26

Box office
Dirty Deeds grossed $5,083,187 at the box office in Australia.

Home media
In America, the film was distributed by DEJ Productions and released on DVD by Paramount Home Entertainment on 4 November 2003.

See also
Cinema of Australia

References

External links
 
 
Dirty Deeds at the National Film and Sound Archive
Dirty Deeds at Oz Movies

2002 films
Australian crime comedy-drama films
Films set in Sydney
Films set in 1969
Films about organised crime in Australia
Films directed by David Caesar
2000s crime comedy-drama films
2002 comedy films
2002 drama films
2000s English-language films
2000s Australian films